June 30 - Eastern Orthodox Church calendar - July 2

All fixed commemorations below are celebrated on July 14 by Old Calendar.

For July 1st, Orthodox Churches on the Old Calendar commemorate the Saints listed on June 18.

Saints
 Holy and Wonderworking Unmercenaries Cosmas and Damian, brothers (284)
 Holy 2000 Martyrs, by the sword.
 Holy 25 Martyrs in Nicomedia, by fire.
 Saint Maurice.
 Venerable Peter the Patrician (Peter of Constantinople), monk (854)
 Venerable Basil, founder of the Monastery of the Deep Stream, Cappadocia (10th century)
 Saint Leo the Hermit, Ascetic.

Pre-Schism Western saints
 Saint Martin of Vienne, third Bishop of Vienne in France  (c. 132)
 Martyr Potitus at Naples (161)  (see also: January 13)
 Martyrs Julius and Aaron, Protomartyrs of Wales, suffered in Caerleon-on-Usk under Diocletian (304)
 Saints Castus and Secundinus, much venerated in the south of Italy; they were born in Sinuessa (Mondragone) near Caserta (305)
 Saint Domitian (c. 337-440)
 Saint Theodoric (Thierry, Theodericus), Abbot of Mont d'Or near Rheims in the north of France; priest and disciple of the blessed Bishop Remigius (c. 533)
 Saint Carilefus (Calais), a companion of St Avitus, founded the monastery of Anisole in Maine in France (c. 536)
 Saint Gal I (Gallus of Clermont), Bishop of Clermont, uncle and teacher of St Gregory of Tours (c. 553)
 Saint Leonorius (Léonor, Lunaire) (c. 570)
 Saint Eparchius (Cybar), born in a noble family in Périgord in France, he renounced his title to become a monk at Sessac in Gaul (581)
 Saint Serf (Servanus), the Apostle of West Fife in East Scotland, who reposed and was buried in Culross (c. 583)
 Saint Veep ((Veepus, Veepy, Wimp, Wennapa), patron saint of St Veep in Cornwall (6th century)
 Saint Cewydd, a saint of Anglesey in Wales and at Lancaut in Gloucestershire in England (6th century)
 Saint Juthwara, sister of St. Sidwell; she was of British descent and lived in Devon in England (7th century)

Post-Schism Orthodox saints
 Martyr Constantine of Cyprus (Constantine of Allemagne), Wonderworker, and those with him (late 12th century)
 Venerable Leontius of Rădăuți, Bishop of Rădăuți in Moldavia (1432)
 Saint Angelina (Branković), Despotina of Serbia (16th century)

New martyrs and confessors
 New Hieromartyr Arcadius Garyaev, priest (1918)
 New Hieromartyr Alexis Drozdov, deacon (1942)

Other commemorations
 Second translation of the relics of Venerable John of Rila (946), from Veliko Tarnovo to Rila (1470)
 Synaxis of the Saints of Crete.  ( On the first Sunday between July 1–7 )

Icon gallery

Notes

References

Sources 
 July 1/14. Orthodox Calendar (PRAVOSLAVIE.RU).
 July 14 / July 1. HOLY TRINITY RUSSIAN ORTHODOX CHURCH (A parish of the Patriarchate of Moscow).
 July 1. OCA - The Lives of the Saints.
 July 1. Latin Saints of the Orthodox Patriarchate of Rome.
 The Roman Martyrology. Transl. by the Archbishop of Baltimore. Last Edition, According to the Copy Printed at Rome in 1914. Revised Edition, with the Imprimatur of His Eminence Cardinal Gibbons. Baltimore: John Murphy Company, 1916. pp. 191–192.
 Rev. Richard Stanton. A Menology of England and Wales, or, Brief Memorials of the Ancient British and English Saints Arranged According to the Calendar, Together with the Martyrs of the 16th and 17th Centuries. London: Burns & Oates, 1892. pp. 297–302.
Greek Sources
 Great Synaxaristes:  1 ΙΟΥΛΙΟΥ. ΜΕΓΑΣ ΣΥΝΑΞΑΡΙΣΤΗΣ.
  Συναξαριστής. 1 Ιουλίου. ECCLESIA.GR. (H ΕΚΚΛΗΣΙΑ ΤΗΣ ΕΛΛΑΔΟΣ). 
Russian Sources
  14 июля (1 июля). Православная Энциклопедия под редакцией Патриарха Московского и всея Руси Кирилла (электронная версия). (Orthodox Encyclopedia - Pravenc.ru).
  1 июля (ст.ст.) 14 июля 2013 (нов. ст.). Русская Православная Церковь Отдел внешних церковных связей. (DECR).

July in the Eastern Orthodox calendar